In geometry, a singular point on a curve is one where the curve is not given by a smooth embedding of a parameter. The precise definition of a singular point depends on the type of curve being studied.

Algebraic curves in the plane
Algebraic curves in the plane may be defined as the set of points  satisfying an equation of the form  where  is a polynomial function  If  is expanded as

If the origin  is on the curve then . If  then the implicit function theorem guarantees there is a smooth function  so that the curve has the form  near the origin. Similarly, if  then there is a smooth function  so that the curve has the form  near the origin. Note that at the origin

The singular points are those points on the curve where both partial derivatives vanish,

Regular points
Assume the curve passes through the origin and write  Then  can be written

This analysis can be applied to any point on the curve by translating the coordinate axes so that the origin is at the given point.

Double points

Again putting   can be written

Double points can be classified according to the solutions of

Crunodes

The curve in this case crosses itself at the origin and has two distinct tangents corresponding to the two solutions of  The function  has a saddle point at the origin in this case.

Acnodes

In the real plane the origin is an isolated point on the curve; however when considered as a complex curve the origin is not isolated and has two imaginary tangents corresponding to the two complex solutions of  The function  has a local extremum at the origin in this case.

Cusps

The curve in this case changes direction at the origin creating a sharp point. The curve has a single tangent at the origin which may be considered as two coincident tangents.

Further classification
The term node is used to indicate either a crunode or an acnode, in other words a double point which is not a cusp. The number of nodes and the number of cusps on a curve are two of the invariants used in the Plücker formulas.

In this case the origin is called a flecnode. If both tangents have this property, so  is a factor of  then the origin is called a biflecnode.

Multiple points

The curve will have, in general,  tangents at the origin though some of these tangents may be imaginary.

Parametric curves

Many curves can be defined in either fashion, but the two definitions may not agree. For example, the cusp can be defined on an algebraic curve,  or on a parametrised curve,  Both definitions give a singular point at the origin.

Care needs to be taken when choosing a parameterization. When parametrised by  it is nonsingular. Hence, it is technically more correct to discuss singular points of a smooth mapping rather than a singular point of a curve.

The above definitions can be extended to cover implicit curves which are defined as the zero set  of a smooth function, and it is not necessary just to consider algebraic varieties. The definitions can be extended to cover curves in higher dimensions.

A theorem of Hassler Whitney states

Any parameterized curve can also be defined as an implicit curve, and the classification of singular points of curves can be studied as a classification of singular point of an algebraic variety.

Types of singular points
Some of the possible singularities are:
An isolated point:  an acnode
Two lines crossing:  a crunode
A cusp:  also called a spinode
A tacnode: 
A rhamphoid cusp:

See also
Singular point of an algebraic variety
Singularity theory
Morse theory

References

Curves
Algebraic curves
Singularity theory